Peter Moraing (born 13 September 1961) is a former professional tennis player from West Germany.

Career
Moraing appeared at two Wimbledon Championships during his career. In the 1993 tournament he faced tenth seed Andrei Medvedev in the opening round and won the first set in a tiebreak, but went on to lose in four sets. The West German competed in the men's doubles at the 1993 Wimbledon Championships, with his younger brother Heiner Moraing. They were beaten in the first round by the Spanish pairing over Sergio Casal and Emilio Sánchez.

He defeated top 30 player Slobodan Živojinović at the Open de Moselle in 1986 and also that year had a win over Todd Witsken, en route to the Tokyo Outdoor round of 16.

Moraing is now a tennis coach and runs a tennis center with his brother in Mülheim.

Challenger titles

Singles: (1)

References

1961 births
Living people
West German male tennis players
Sportspeople from Essen
Tennis people from North Rhine-Westphalia